Idol Room was a South Korean television program which aired on JTBC every Tuesday at 18:30 (KST) and was hosted by Jeong Hyeong-don and Defconn. The program is inspired by JTBC Newsroom, and it is produced in order to be the idol-specialised program with number one credibility.

It was also simulcasted through Naver V Live until episode 41. The show began on May 12, 2018, and originally aired on Saturdays at 16:40 (KST). The final episode of the season aired on February 11, 2020.

Airtime

Host
The nicknames for the hosts are inspired by Sohn Suk-hee.
Jung Hyung-don (Don Hee)
Defconn (Con Hee)

Program
Usually, during or after each episode's recording, there will be a short live stream through Idol Room's Naver V Live channel that acts as a teaser to the episode. This will not be available anymore after episode 41.

Studio Set
The studio sets used are as follow:
Episodes 1-8: Black room with a large landscape screen at the background
Episodes 9-51: Beige room with a tall portrait screen at the back
Episode 52-87: Pink room with a landscape screen at the back

In some special episodes, the 2 hosts will go outdoors.

Theme Song
There are two theme songs for the show, one being produced by Pentagon's Hui and the other being produced by (G)I-DLE's Soyeon. In episode 5, where they appeared with their groups, they each were tasked with composing a theme song for the show. The theme songs will be played at the start of each alternate episode, beginning from episode 7 with Hui's produced theme song, and episode 8 with Soyeon's produced theme song. This has been discontinued since the introduction of Idol 999.

A third theme song, which is produced by N.Flying's Lee Seung-hyub, was performed live by the band at the start of episode 42.

Featured Corners

Current
Idol 999 Forced Auditions: This is the program's new project which started on episode 52. It lets the 2 hosts find 999 idol group members and form the co-ed group 1001 (read as "One Oh Oh One") together. Every week, the guest(s) will undergo individual and group evaluations throughout the episode, and at any point of time the 2 hosts can give or take away grade(s) from each guest. The final grade of each guest can be of a single grade (e.g. A or B), or multiple grades (e.g. AA or ABF). The final member to be picked for Idol 999 will be selected through the Bomb Dance. When the balloon bursts while this member was holding it, even when they were in the middle of the handover, that member will become the selected idol to join Idol 999. There are other procedures done to choose the idol to join Idol 999:
 For episode 54, instead of the Bomb Dance, the Bomb Interview is used as selection. The guests will pass down the bomb after saying a sentence, and this will be done continuously until the balloon bursts and the guest holding it when it bursts is the selected idol to join Idol 999.
 For episode 55, where there is only Jeon So-mi taking part in the audition, the rendition of the game "He loves me... he loves me not" is played to decide whether she will join Idol 999 or not.
 For episode 58, where there is only Eun Ji-won taking part in the audition, he will draw lots to decide whether he will join Idol 999 or not.
 For episode 60, the members of NCT Dream will do 10 elephant spins and each will attempt to touch Don Hee's finger with his finger. The first member to touch will be the member of Idol 999.
 For episode 64, the members of Pretty 95s will each compete against Don Hee for pulling the Couple Bar ice cream in half, and the member with the bigger portion pulled out will be the member of Idol 999.
 For episode 65, Apink members Park Cho-rong and Kim Nam-joo will have to push fellow member Oh Ha-young, who was sitting on the hyodo chair, to the target and whether she lands on the target or not will decide whether she will join Idol 999 or not.
 For the Twice audition, each member picks an Idol Room umbrella. The member who picked the umbrella with the hosts' faces will be the member of Idol 999.
 For the Dreamcatcher-Everglow audition, episodes 78 and 81, the Idol 999 member would be picked through the return of Today's Pick-dol Close-up Camera.
 For episode 75, the game of Yut is played. The stick of the member that shows the face (with the rest of the members showing the crosses) will be the member of Idol 999.
 For episode 84, the members of Cosmic Girls challenge to eat jelly strips without the use of their hands. The fastest to finish her jelly strip will be the member of Idol 999.
 For episode 85, the members of The Boyz challenge to inflate balloons with their mouths. The fastest to burst his balloon will be the member of Idol 999.
 For episode 86, based on a theme, the GFriend member who did the same pose as Sowon (who is already a member of Idol 999) will be the member of Idol 999.
 For episode 87, Ghost Leg is used. Eun Ji-won (who is already a member of Idol 999) will trace from a start point he chose and eventually to the Sechs Kies member, who then becomes the member of Idol 999.
Metal Tray Dance Room: A corner introduced in Twice's third visit. This is a parody of the Metal Tray Karaoke Room from KBS show Happy Together. Each member stands below his/her metal tray, and he/she has to dance only when the light in front of him/her lights up, if not it is considered a failure and the whole group will be punished by getting hit by the metal trays above. Starting from episode 52, this corner is part of Idol 999's group evaluations.
Ending Fairy Selection Bomb Dance: A corner introduced in Twice's third visit. All members dance to their new song while passing the balloon bomb around, and each member has to hold it for at least 5 seconds before being able to pass it around. When it bursts while one member is holding it, that member will become the "Ending Fairy". The benefit for becoming the "Ending Fairy" is that from immediately after the end of this corner until the closing of the episode, all cameras would be focused on this member. Starting from episode 52, this corner has become the crucial corner in order to select the idol for Idol 999 in each episode.
Swimming Competition: A corner typically introduced to male idol groups for the Idol 999 Forced Auditions. Competing members will drink up the water through the straws as fast as possible until his own character falls to the line.
Toast King: A semi-fixed corner where all members each attempt to catch a piece of bread that has bounced from the toaster with their mouths.
Havana Korea Selections: A corner typically introduced to female guests only. All guests will dance to Havana in their own ways, one by one. The 2 hosts will pick a winner after all dances for the episode are done. This is often used to pick the sexiest member of the group. If the week's guest is only one person, she must dance to the song numerous times in different kinds of sexy dances to be crowned as uncontested winner.

Former

Nano Dance: All members of the group will dance to their latest title song together first, then at the killing part each member dances to his/her own individual part one by one while the rest of the members stop moving, after that they will continue to the next part together.
An alternative of this corner specifically for bands, named Nano Band, was introduced in episode 42 with N.Flying as guests. All members of the band will perform the song together first, then at the killing part each member responsible for his own role will do his/her own individual part one by one while the rest of the members stop performing, after that they will continue to the next part together.
If the week's guest is only 1 person, the Nano Dance will be either:
Repeat the same killing part 3 times: once with only the face moving, once with only the upper body moving, and once with only the lower body moving. This is seen during the episode with Seungri as guest.
Showing different sides of the guest while repeating the same killing part. This is seen during the episode with Sunmi as guest.
Fact Check: A corner to check on whether the news, rumors or theses about the individual members or the whole group are true or not. Before the recording of each episode, a notice would be put up on the Idol Room's Naver V Live channel to gather questions. There is an alternate version, named Live Fact Check, where the show would receive questions through a live stream instead of a notice.
Q100 Question Vending Machine: A special corner introduced in Twice's third visit. The production team will collect questions from fans around the world and choose 100 questions to be placed inside the vending machine. The members place the coins into the vending machine and select the question package each member wants, and that question will be answered in the show.
Does (Group name) Know Their Members Well: A special corner for groups approaching or past their debut anniversaries. The corner prepares in-depth questions about the members, and they will also be fact-checked. It was first introduced to Twice on their second visit.
My Idol's Guinness: All guests will challenge for a new type of Guinness Record.
To Me Letter: A special corner wherein all guests will each film video messages to their past selves in their debut year.
One Column Dance: All guests stand in one column and dance to the mission song(s), showing the synchronisation between all members of the group. It was first introduced to GFriend.
Today's Pick-dol Close-up Camera: All guests lie down surrounding the roulette that has a camera attached at the centre. The roulette is spun and the 1 person who is captured when it stopped spinning is picked as the episode's Pick-dol. Fancams of every corner focused on the Pick-dol will be uploaded on the Idol Room's Naver V Live channel after the episode has finished its broadcasting. There is an alternate version, named Today's Live Pick-dol Close-up Camera, where the corner will be progressed with a live stream, but will not reveal who is picked as the episode's Pick-dol. It will only be revealed during the broadcast of the episode, as per normal. The corner was discontinued starting episode 44, with the introduction of the LG U+ Idol Live application.
For the solo guests, the corner will be progressed with either different sides/emotions of the guest or with some of the staff wearing masks of celebrities related to the guest; for the latter scenario, if the guest was not picked, the reactions of the picked non-guest will be used, but fancams of the guest will still be uploaded.
For episode 28, with 21 guests, they play Rock–paper–scissors with Con Hee as the opponent, and the game is played (eliminated in the first round if one loses to Con Hee, and eliminated in the final rounds if one doesn't tie with Con Hee) until there is only 1 guest left and the Pick-dol is chosen.
357 Dance: Any number (from zero to all members of the group) will be called out by Don Hee at any random timing while the mission song is played. The corresponding number of members will move to the middle of the studio and dance to the mission song.
Attention Dance: All guests set themselves in the position of at attention and dance to the mission song(s), without moving their arms.
N.C.N Dance: Acronym for "When Number is Called Find the Camera With the Number Dance", also known as "Bun Bul Bun Dan"; Don Hee will call out any camera number from 1 to 6 at any random timing and all guests will have to move in front of the numbered camera and dance in front of the camera, marking it as the centre.

Episodes (2018)

Episodes (2019)

Episodes (2020)

Ratings 
In the ratings below, the highest rating for the show will be in red, and the lowest rating for the show will be in blue each year. Some of the ratings found have already been rounded off to 1 decimal place, as they are usually of lower rankings in terms of the day's ratings.

2018

2019

2020

 Note that the show airs on a cable channel (pay TV), which plays part in its slower uptake and relatively small audience share when compared to programs broadcast (FTA) on public networks such as KBS, SBS, MBC or EBS.
NR rating means "not reported".
 TNmS have stopped publishing their rating reports from June 2018.

Notes

References

External links

 on Naver V Live

South Korean variety television shows
Korean-language television shows
2018 South Korean television series debuts
2020 South Korean television series endings